Charles Winston Chapman (April 21, 1911 – March 6, 2002) was a Canadian basketball player who competed in the 1936 Summer Olympics.

Born in Vancouver, he was part of the Canadian basketball team, which won the silver medal. He played four matches including the final. He was the older brother of Art Chapman, who also participated at the Berlin Games.

References

External links
basketball BC profile
dataOlympics profile
FrozenHoops.com History of basketball in Canada. Selection of Top 100 Canadian players of all time

1911 births
2002 deaths
Basketball players at the 1936 Summer Olympics
Basketball position missing
Canadian men's basketball players
Canadian people of Scottish descent
Olympic basketball players of Canada
Olympic medalists in basketball
Olympic silver medalists for Canada
Basketball players from Vancouver
Medalists at the 1936 Summer Olympics